Between 1901 and 2018, the average global sea level rose by , or 1–2 mm per year. This rate is increasing; sea levels are now rising at a rate of 3.7 mm (0.146 inches) per year. Human-caused climate change is predominantly the cause, as it constantly heats (and thus expands) the ocean and melts land-based ice sheets and glaciers. Between 1993 and 2018, thermal expansion of water contributed 42% to sea level rise (SLR); melting of temperate glaciers contributed 21%; Greenland contributed 15%; and Antarctica contributed 8%. Because sea level rise lags changes in Earth temperature, it will continue to accelerate between now and 2050 purely in response to already-occurring warming; whether it continues to accelerate after that depends on human greenhouse gas emissions.

Rising seas pose both a direct risk of flooding unprotected areas and indirect threats of higher storm surges, king tides, and tsunamis. They are also associated with second-order effects such as loss of coastal ecosystems like mangroves, losses in crop production due to freshwater salinization of irrigation water, and the disruption of sea trade due to damaged ports. Globally, just the projected sea level rise by 2050 will expose places currently inhabited by tens of millions of people to annual flooding. This may increase to hundreds of millions in the latter decades of the century if greenhouse gas emissions are not reduced drastically. While slow increases in sea level may allow time for adaptation, such as building sea walls, the passage of time can also increase the number of people at risk, as many coastal areas have large population growth. Later in the century, millions more would be affected in cities such as Miami, Rio de Janeiro, Osaka and Shanghai under the warming of 3 °C (5.4 °F), which is close to the current trajectory.

While the rise in sea levels ultimately impacts every coastal and island population on Earth, it does not occur uniformly due to local factors like tides, currents, storms, tectonic effects and land subsidence. Moreover, the differences in resilience and adaptive capacity of ecosystems, sectors, and countries again mean that the impacts will be highly variable. For instance, sea level rise along US coasts (and along the US East Coast in particular) is already higher than the global average, and it is expected to be 2 to 3 times greater than the global average by the end of the century. Yet Asia will be the region where sea level rise would impact the most people. Eight Asian countries—Bangladesh, China, India, Indonesia, Japan, the Philippines, Thailand and Vietnam—account for 70% of the global population exposed to sea level rise and land subsidence. Out of the 20 countries with the greatest exposure to sea level rise, 12 are in Asia. Areas not directly exposed to rising sea levels could still be effected by issues such as large scale migrations and economic disruption. Finally, the greatest near-term impact on human populations will occur in the low-lying Caribbean and Pacific islands—many of those would be rendered uninhabitable by sea level rise later this century.

Societies can adapt to sea level rise in three ways: by managed retreat, by accommodating coastal change, or by protecting against sea level rise through hard-construction practices like seawalls or soft approaches such as dune rehabilitation and beach nourishment. Sometimes these adaptation strategies go hand in hand; at other times choices must be made among different strategies. A managed retreat strategy is difficult if an area's population is quickly increasing: this is a particularly acute problem for Africa, where the population of low-lying coastal areas is projected to increase by around 100 million people within the next 40 years. Poorer nations may also struggle to implement the same approaches to adapt to sea level rise as richer states, and sea level rise at some locations may be compounded by other environmental issues, such as subsidence in so-called sinking cities. Coastal ecosystems typically adapt to rising sea levels by moving inland; but may not always be able to do so, due to natural or artificial barriers.

Observations 

Between 1901 and 2018, the global mean sea level rose by about 20 cm (or 8 inches).

Regional variations 
Sea level rise is not uniform around the globe. Some land masses are moving up or down as a consequence of subsidence (land sinking or settling) or post-glacial rebound (land rising due to the loss of weight from ice melt). Therefore, local relative sea level rise may be higher or lower than the global average.  Gravitational effects of changing ice masses also add to differences in the distribution of sea water around the globe.

When a glacier or an ice sheet melts, the loss of mass reduces its gravitational pull. In some places near current and former glaciers and ice sheets, this has caused local water levels to drop, even as the water levels will increase more than average further away from the ice sheet. Consequently, ice loss in Greenland has a different fingerprint on regional sea level than the equivalent loss in Antarctica. On the other hand, the Atlantic is warming at a faster pace than the Pacific. This has consequences for Europe and the U.S. East Coast, which receives a sea level rise 3–4 times the global average. The downturn of the Atlantic meridional overturning circulation (AMOC) has been also tied to extreme regional sea level rise on the US Northeast Coast.

Many ports, urban conglomerations, and agricultural regions are built on river deltas, where subsidence of land contributes to a substantially increased relative sea level rise. This is caused by both unsustainable extraction of groundwater and/or oil and gas, as well as by levees and other flood management practices preventing the accumulation of sediments which otherwise compensates for the natural settling of deltaic soils. On the other hand, post-glacial isostatic rebound causes relative sea level fall around the Hudson Bay in Canada and the northern Baltic.

Projections 

There are broadly two ways of modelling sea level rise and making future projections. In one approach, scientists use process-based modelling, where all relevant and well-understood physical processes are included in a global physical model. An ice-sheet model is used to calculate the contributions of ice sheets and a general circulation model is used to compute the rising sea temperature and its expansion. A disadvantage is that all relevant processes may not be sufficiently understood, yet the approach can predict non-linearities and long delays in the response which studies of the recent past will miss.

In the other approach, scientists employ semi-empirical techniques using historical geological data to determine likely sea level responses to a warming world, in addition to some basic physical modelling. These semi-empirical sea level models rely on statistical techniques, using relationships between observed past contributions to global mean sea level and global mean temperature. This type of modelling was partially motivated by most physical models in previous Intergovernmental Panel on Climate Change (IPCC) literature assessments having underestimated the amount of sea level rise compared to observations of the 20th century.

Projections for the 21st century 

The Intergovernmental Panel on Climate Change provides multiple plausible scenarios of 21st century sea level rise in each report, starting from the IPCC First Assessment Report in 1990. The differences between scenarios are primarily due to the uncertainty about future greenhouse gas emissions, which are subject to hard to predict political action, as well as economic developments. The scenarios used in the 2013-2014 Fifth Assessment Report (AR5) were called Representative Concentration Pathways, or RCPs. An estimate for sea level rise is given with each RCP, presented as a range with a lower and upper limit, to reflect the unknowns. The RCP 2.6 parthway would see GHG emissions kept low enough to meet the Paris climate agreement goal of limiting warming by 2100 to 2 °C. Estimated SLR by 2100 for RCP 2.6 was about 44 cm (the range given was 28 - 61 cm).

Notably, the report had acknowledged the possibility of global SLR being accelerated by the outright collapse of the marine-based parts of the Antarctic ice sheet, but did not estimate its likelihood due to the lack of reliable information, only stating with medium confidence that if such a collapse occurred, it would not add more than several tens of centimeters to 21st century sea level rise.Since its publication, multiple papers have questioned this decision and presented higher estimates of SLR after attempting to better incorporate ice sheet processes in Antarctica and Greenland and to compare the current events with the paleoclimate data. For instance, a 2017 study from the University of Melbourne researchers estimated that ice sheet processes would increase AR5 sea level rise estimate for the low emission scenario by about one quarter, but they would add nearly half under the moderate scenario and practically double estimated sea level rise under the high emission scenario.

A 2016 study led by Jim Hansen presented a hypothesis of vulnerable ice sheet collapse leading to near-term exponential sea level rise acceleration, with a doubling time of 10, 20 or 40 years, thus leading to multi-meter sea level rise in 50, 100 or 200 years, respectively. However, it remains a minority view amongst the scientific community. For comparison, two expert elicitation papers were published in 2019 and 2020, both looking at low and high emission scenarios. They also estimated a small chance of sea levels exceeding 1 meter by 2100 even in the low emission scenario and of going beyond 2 metres in the high emission scenario, with the latter causing the displacement of 187 million people.

By 2020, the observed ice-sheet losses in Greenland and Antarctica were found to track the upper-end range of the AR5 projections. Consequently, the updated SLR projections in the 2019 IPCC Special Report on the Ocean and Cryosphere in a Changing Climate were somewhat larger than in AR5. A February 2021 paper found that while AR5 projections appeared unrealistically low next to the extrapolation of observed sea level trends, the projections in SROCC were a much better fit.

The IPCC Sixth Assessment Report (AR6) was published in August 2021.

Post-2100 sea level rise 

Models consistent with paleo records of sea level rise indicate that substantial long-term SLR will continue for centuries even if the temperature stabilizes. Additionally, tipping points of Greenland and Antarctica ice sheets are expected to play a larger role over such timescales, with very long-term SLR likely to be dominated by ice loss from Antarctica, especially if the warming exceeds 2 °C (3.6 °F). Continued carbon dioxide emissions from fossil fuel sources could cause additional tens of metres of sea level rise, over the next millennia.

As the models and observational records have improved, a range of studies has attempted to estimate SLR for the years immmediately following 2100, although it remains challenging to do this with high accuracy.

By 2021, AR6 was also able to provide estimates for year 2150 SLR alongside the 2100 estimates for the first time. Finally, the version of SSP5-8.5 involving low-confidence processes has a chance of exceeding  by then.

Causes 

The three main reasons warming causes global sea level to rise are the expansion of oceans due to heating, along with water inflow from melting ice sheets and glaciers. Sea level rise since the start of the 20th century has been dominated by retreat of glaciers and expansion of the ocean, but the contributions of the two large ice sheets (Greenland and Antarctica) are expected to increase in the 21st century.

Much of this precipitation began as water vapor evaporated from the ocean surface. Some of the snow is blown away by wind or disappears from the ice sheet by melt or by sublimation (directly changing into water vapor). The rest of the snow slowly changes into ice. This ice can flow to the edges of the ice sheet and return to the ocean by melting at the edge or in the form of icebergs. If precipitation, surface processes and ice loss at the edge balance each other, sea level remains the same. However scientists have found that ice is being lost, and at an accelerating rate.

Ocean heating 

The oceans store more than 90% of the extra heat added to Earth's climate system by climate change and act as a buffer against its effects. The amount of heat needed to increase average temperature of the entire world ocean by   would increase atmospheric temperature by approximately : a small change in the mean temperature of the ocean represents a very large change in the total heat content of the climate system.

When the ocean gains heat, the water expands and sea level rises. The amount of expansion varies with both water temperature and pressure. For each degree, warmer water and water under great pressure (due to depth) expand more than cooler water and water under less pressure. Consequently cold Arctic Ocean water will expand less than warm tropical water. Because different climate models present slightly different patterns of ocean heating, their predictions do not agree fully on the contribution of ocean heating to SLR.

With 3–5 °C of warming under high emissions pathways, this probability rises to >80% to >99%.

Antarctica

The large volume of ice on the Antarctic continent stores around 70% of the world's fresh water. The Antarctic ice sheet mass balance is affected by snowfall accumulations, and ice discharge along the periphery. Under the influence of global warming, melt at the base of the ice sheet increases. Warming can also result in increased snowfall, but this accelerates ice flow into the ocean; so the ice sheet's mass gain due to snowfall is partially offset. Snowfall increased over the last two centuries, but no increase was found in the interior of Antarctica over the last four decades. Based on changes of Antarctica's ice mass balance over millions of years, due to natural climate fluctuations, researchers concluded that the sea-ice acts as a barrier for warmer waters surrounding the continent. Consequently, the loss of sea ice is a major driver of the instability of the entire ice sheet.

Different satellite methods for measuring ice mass and change are in good agreement, and combining methods leads to more certainty about how the East Antarctic Ice Sheet, the West Antarctic Ice Sheet, and the Antarctic Peninsula evolve. A 2018 systematic review study estimated that ice loss across the entire continent was 43 gigatons (Gt) per year on average during the period from 1992 to 2002, but has accelerated to an average of 220 Gt per year during the five years from 2012 to 2017. Most of the melt comes from the West Antarctic Ice Sheet, but the Antarctic Peninsula and East Antarctic Ice Sheet also contribute. The sea level rise due to Antarctica has been estimated to be 0.25 mm per year from 1993 to 2005, and 0.42 mm per year from 2005 to 2015. All datasets generally show an acceleration of mass loss from the Antarctic ice-sheet, but with year-to-year variations.

By 2019, several studies have attempted to estimate 2300 sea level rise caused by ice loss in Antarctica alone: they suggest  median and  maximum values under the low-emission scenario but a median of  metres (with a minimum of  60 cm and a maximum of ) under the highest-emission scenario.

East Antarctica
The world's largest potential source of sea level rise is the East Antarctic Ice Sheet (EAIS). It holds enough ice to raise global sea levels by 53.3 m (174 ft 10 in) Historically, it was less studied than the West Antarctica as it had been considered relatively stable. An impression that was backed up by satellite observations and modelling of its surface mass balance. However, a 2019 study employed different methodology and concluded that East Antarctica is already losing ice mass overall. All methods agree that the Totten Glacier has lost ice in recent decades in response to ocean warming and possibly a reduction in local sea ice cover. Totten Glacier is the primary outlet of the Aurora Subglacial Basin, a major ice reservoir in East Antarctica that could rapidly retreat due to hydrological processes. The global sea level potential of  flowing through Totten Glacier alone is of similar magnitude to the entire probable contribution of the West Antarctic Ice Sheet.

The other major ice reservoir on East Antarctica that might rapidly retreat is the Wilkes Basin which is subject to marine ice sheet instability. Ice loss from these outlet glaciers is possibly compensated by accumulation gains in other parts of Antarctica. Once this tipping point is crossed, the collapse of these subglacial basins could take place as little as 500 or as much as 10,000 years: the median timeline is 2000 years. It is also suggested that the loss of two-thirds of its volume may require at least  of warming.

West Antarctica

Even though East Antarctica contains the largest potential source of sea level rise, West Antarctica ice sheet (WAIS) is substantially more vulnerable.

This is because WAIS is vulnerable to several types of instability whose role remains difficult to model. These include hydrofracturing (where meltwater collecting atop the ice sheet pools into fractures and forces them open), increased contact of warm ocean water with ice shelves due to climate-change induced ocean circulation changes, marine ice sheet instability (warm water entering between the seafloor and the base of the ice sheet once it is no longer heavy enough to displace the flow, causing accelerated melting and collapse) and even marine ice cliff instability (ice cliffs with heights greater than  collapsing under their own weight once they are no longer buttressed by ice shelves). These processes do not have equal influence and are not all equally likely to happen: for instance, marine ice cliff instability has never been observed and was ruled out by some of the more detailed modelling.

The Thwaites and Pine Island glaciers have been identified as potentially prone to ice sheet instability processes. Both glaciers' bedrock topography gets deeper farther inland, exposing them to more warm water intrusion into the grounding zone. Their contribution to global sea levels has already accelerated since the beginning of the 21st century, with the Thwaites Glacier now amounting to 4% of the global sea level rise. At the end of 2021, it was estimated that the Thwaites Ice Shelf can collapse in three to five years, which would then make the destabilization of the entire Thwaites glacier inevitable. The Thwaites glacier itself will cause a rise of sea level by  if it will completely collapse, although this process is estimated to unfold over several centuries.

Moreover, the crucial buttressing position of the Thwaites Glacier means that its loss can destabilize the entire West Antarctic Ice Sheet. Most of the bedrock underlying the West Antarctic Ice Sheet lies well below sea level. This possibility of complete destabilization was first proposed back in the 1970s. A 1978 study by J.H. Mercer predicted that anthropogenic  emissions doubling by 2050 would cause  of SLR due to the rapid loss of the West Antarctic ice sheet alone. In 2022, the collapse of the entire West Antarctica was estimated to unfold over a period of about 2000 years, with the absolute minimum of 500 years (and a potential maximum of 13,000 years.)

Greenland 

Other Greenland ice forms isolated glaciers and ice caps. The sources contributing to sea level rise from Greenland are from ice sheet melting (70%) and from glacier calving (30%). Average annual ice loss in Greenland more than doubled in the early 21st century compared to the 20th century, and there was a corresponding increase in SLR contribution from 0.07 mm per year between 1992 and 1997 to 0.68 mm per year between 2012 and 2017. Total ice loss from the Greenland Ice Sheet between 1992 and 2018 amounted to 3,902 gigatons (Gt) of ice, which is equivalent to the SLR of 10.8 mm. The contribution for the 2012–2016 period was equivalent to 37% of sea level rise from land ice sources (excluding thermal expansion). This rate of ice sheet melting is also associated with the higher end of predictions from the past IPCC assessment reports.

Certain parts of the Greenland ice sheet are already known to be committed to unstoppable sea level rise. Greenland's peripheral glaciers and ice caps crossed an irreversible tipping point around 1997, and will continue to melt. A subsequent study had found that the climate of the past 20 years (2000–2019) would already result of the loss of ~3.3% volume in this manner in the future, committing the ice sheet to an eventual  of SLR, independent of any future temperature change. There is also a global warming threshold beyond which a near-complete melting of the Greenland ice sheet occurs. A 2021 analysis of sub-glacial sediment at the bottom of a 1.4 km Greenland ice core finds that the Greenland ice sheet melted away at least once during the last million years, even though the temperatures have never been higher than  greater than today over that period. Once crossed, it would take between 1000 and 15,000 years for the ice sheet to disintegrate entirely, with the most likely estimate of 10,000 years.

Glaciers

There are roughly 200,000 glaciers on Earth, which are spread out across all continents. Less than 1% of glacier ice is in mountain glaciers, compared to 99% in Greenland and Antarctica. However, this small size also makes mountain glaciers more vulnerable to melting than the larger ice sheets. This means they have had a disproportionate contribution to historical sea level rise and are set to contribute a smaller, but still significant fraction of sea level rise in the 21st century. Observational and modelling studies of mass loss from glaciers and ice caps indicate a contribution to sea level rise of 0.2-0.4 mm per year, averaged over the 20th century. The contribution for the 2012–2016 period was nearly as large as that of Greenland: 0.63 mm of sea level rise per year, equivalent to 34% of sea level rise from land ice sources. Glaciers contributed around 40% to sea level rise during the 20th century, with estimates for the 21st century of around 30%. The IPCC Fifth Assessment Report estimated that glaciers contributing  to global sea levels.

Because glacier mass is disproportionately concentrated in the most resilient glaciers, this would in practice remove between 49% to 83% of glacier formations. It had further estimated that the current likely trajectory of  would result in the SLR contribution of ~ by 2100. Mountain glaciers are even more vulnerable over the longer term. In 2022, another Science paper estimated that almost no mountain glaciers can be expected to survive once the warming crosses  , and their complete loss largely inevitable around : there's even a possibility of complete loss after 2100 at just . This could happen as early as 50 years after the tipping point is crossed, although 200 years is the most likely value, and the maximum is around 1000 years.

Sea ice 
Sea ice melt contributes very slightly to global sea level rise. If the melt water from ice floating in the sea was exactly the same as sea water then, according to Archimedes' principle, no rise would occur. However melted sea ice contains less dissolved salt than sea water and is therefore less dense: in other words, although the melted sea ice weighs the same as the sea water it was displacing when it was ice, its volume is still slightly greater.

Land water storage 

Humans impact how much water is stored on land. Building dams prevents large masses of water from flowing into the sea and therefore increases the storage of water on land. On the other hand, humans extract water from lakes, wetlands and underground reservoirs for food production leading to rising seas. Furthermore, the hydrological cycle is influenced by climate change and deforestation, which can lead to further positive and negative contributions to sea level rise. In the 20th century, these processes roughly balanced, but dam building has slowed down and is expected to stay low for the 21st century.

Measurement 

Sea level changes can be driven by variations in the amount of water in the oceans, by changes in the volume of that water, or by varying land elevation compared to the sea surface. Over a consistent time period, conducting assessments can source contributions to sea level rise and provide early indications of change in trajectory. This type of surveillance can inform plans of prevention. The different techniques used to measure changes in sea level do not measure exactly the same level. Tide gauges can only measure relative sea level, whilst satellites can also measure absolute sea level changes. To get precise measurements for sea level, researchers studying the ice and the oceans on our planet factor in ongoing deformations of the solid Earth, in particular due to landmasses still rising from past ice masses retreating, and also the Earth's gravity and rotation.

Satellites

Since the launch of TOPEX/Poseidon in 1992, an overlapping series of altimetric satellites has been continuously recording the sea level and its changes. Those satellites can measure the hills and valleys in the sea caused by currents and detect trends in their height. To measure the distance to the sea surface, the satellites send a microwave pulse which reflects on the ocean's surface and record the time it takes to return. Microwave radiometers correct the additional delay caused by water vapor in the atmosphere. Combining these data with the precisely known location of the spacecraft determines the sea-surface height to within a few centimetres (about one inch). Earlier satellite measurements were previously slightly at odds with tide gauge measurements. A small calibration error for the Topex/Poseidon satellite was eventually identified as having caused a slight overestimation of the 1992–2005 sea levels, which masked in the satellite measurements the ongoing sea level rise acceleration that was visible in the tide gauge timeseries.

Satellites are useful for measuring regional variations in sea level, such as the substantial rise between 1993 and 2012 in the western tropical Pacific. This sharp rise has been linked to increasing trade winds, which occur when the Pacific Decadal Oscillation (PDO) and the El Niño–Southern Oscillation (ENSO) change from one state to the other. The PDO is a basin-wide climate pattern consisting of two phases, each commonly lasting 10 to 30 years, while the ENSO has a shorter period of 2 to 7 years.

Tide gauges 

The global network of tide gauges is another important source of sea-level observations. Compared to the satellite record, this record has major spatial gaps but covers a much longer period of time. Coverage of tide gauges started primarily in the Northern Hemisphere, with data for the Southern Hemisphere remaining scarce up to the 1970s. The longest running sea-level measurements, NAP or Amsterdam Ordnance Datum established in 1675, are recorded in Amsterdam, the Netherlands. In Australia record collection is also quite extensive, including measurements by an amateur meteorologist beginning in 1837 and measurements taken from a sea-level benchmark struck on a small cliff on the Isle of the Dead near the Port Arthur convict settlement in 1841.

This network was used, in combination with satellite altimeter data, to establish that global mean sea-level rose  between 1870 and 2004 at an average rate of about 1.44 mm/yr (1.7 mm/yr during the 20th century). This is an important confirmation of climate change simulations which predicted that sea level rise would accelerate in response to climate change.

Some regional differences are also visible in the tide gauge data. Some of the recorded regional differences are due to differences in the actual sea level, while other are due to vertical land movements. In Europe for instance, considerable variation is found because some land areas are rising while others are sinking. Since 1970, most tidal stations have measured higher seas, but sea levels along the northern Baltic Sea have dropped due to post-glacial rebound.

General impacts 

The impacts of current and future sea level rise include higher and more frequent high-tide and storm-surge flooding, increased coastal erosion, inhibition of primary production processes, more extensive coastal inundation, along with changes in surface water quality and groundwater.These can lead to a greater loss of property and coastal habitats, loss of life during floods and loss of non-monetary cultural resources. Agriculture and  aquaculture can also be impacted. There can also be loss of tourism, recreation, and transport related functions.. Coastal flooding impacts are exacerbated by land use changes such as urbanisation or deforestation of low-lying coastal zones. Regions that are already vulnerable to the rising sea level also struggle with coastal flooding washing away land and altering the landscape.

Because the projected extent of sea level rise by 2050 will be only slightly affected by any changes in emissions, there's confidence that 2050 levels of SLR combined with the 2010 population distribution (i.e. absent the effects of population growth and human migration) would result in ~150 million people under the water line during high tide and ~300 million in places which are flooded every year—an increase of 40 and 50 million people relative to 2010 values for the same. By 2100, the difference between the 2050 sea level rise and the low and high end of the median sea level rise estimates for 2100 is equivalent to the difference between ~40 million more people under the water line during high tide and ~50 million more in places which are flooded every year (190 and 350 million people) and ~80 and ~90 million more for the same metrics (230 and 390 million people), respectively.

Over the longer term, coastal areas are particularly vulnerable to rising sea levels, changes in the frequency and intensity of storms, increased precipitation, and rising ocean temperatures. Furthermore, two-thirds of the world's cities with over five million people are located in these low-lying coastal areas. In total, approximately 600 million people live directly on the coast around the world.

Even populations who live further inland may be impacted by a potential disruption of sea trade, and by migrations. In 2023, United Nations secretary general António Guterres warned that sea level rises risk causing human migrations on a "biblical scale". Sea level rise will inevitably affect ports, but the current research into this subject is limited. Not enough is known about the investments required to protect the ports currently in use, and for how they may be protected before it becomes more reasonable to build new port facilities elsewhere. Moreover, some coastal regions are rich agricultural lands, whose loss to the sea can result in food shortages elsewhere. This is a particularly acute issue for river deltas such as Nile Delta in Egypt and Red River and Mekong Deltas in Vietnam, which are disproportionately affected by saltwater intrusion into the soil and irrigation water.

Ecosystems

When seawater reaches inland, coastal plants, birds, and freshwater/estuarine fish are threatened with habitat loss due to flooding and soil/water salinization. So-called ghost forests emerge when coastal forest areas become inundated with saltwater to the point no trees can survive. At worst, entire species can be driven extinct. In 2016, an island in the Great Barrier Reef called Bramble Cay was inundated, flooding the habitat of a rodent named Bramble Cay melomys. In 2019, it was officially declared extinct by the federal government of Australia.

While some ecosystems can move land inward with the high-water mark, many are prevented from migrating due to natural or artificial barriers. This coastal narrowing, sometimes called 'coastal squeeze' when considering human-made barriers, could result in the loss of habitats such as mudflats and tidal marshes. Mangrove ecosystems on the mudflats of tropical coasts nurture high biodiversity, yet they are particularly vulnerable due to mangrove plants' relliance on breathing roots or pneumatophores, which might grow to be half a metre tall. While mangroves can adjust to rising sea levels by migrating inland and building vertically using accumulated sediment and organic matter, they will be submerged if the rate is too rapid, resulting in the loss of an ecosystem. Both mangroves and tidal marshes protect against storm surges, waves and tsunamis, so their loss makes the effects of sea level rise worse. Human activities, such as dam building, may restrict sediment supplies to wetlands, and thereby prevent natural adaptation processes. The loss of some tidal marshes is unavoidable as a consequence.

Likewise, corals, important for bird and fish life, need to grow vertically to remain close to the sea surface in order to get enough energy from sunlight. The corals have so far been able to keep up the vertical growth with the rising seas, but might not be able to do so in the future.

Adaptation

Adaptation options to sea level rise can be broadly classified into retreat, accommodate and protect. Retreating is moving people and infrastructure to less exposed areas and preventing further development in areas that are at risk. However, this often results in the loss of livelihoods and the displaced people could become a strain on the regions or cities they come to inhabit, potentially accelerating social tensions. Accommodation options are intended to make societies more flexible to sea level rise. Examples are the cultivation of food crops that tolerate a high salt content in the soil and making new building standards which require building to be built higher and have less damage in the case a flood does occur. However, these options tend to carry increased costs, as seen with salt-resistant crop variants being more expensive than the ordinary crops. Finally, areas can be protected by the construction of dams, dikes and by improving natural defenses.  Storm surges and flooding can be instantaneous and devastating to cities, and some coastal areas have begun investing in storm water valves to cope with more frequent and severe flooding during high tides.

These adaptation options can be further divided into hard and soft. Hard adaptation relies mostly on capital-intensive human-built infrastructure and involves large-scale changes to human societies and ecological systems. Because of its large scale, it is often not flexible. Soft adaptation involves strengthening natural defenses and adaptation strategies in local communities and the use of simple and modular technology, which can be locally owned. The two types of adaptation might be complementary or mutually exclusive.

Cutting greenhouse gas emissions (or climate change mitigation) can stabilize sea level rise rates beyond 2050, but can not prevent sea levels from rising. Thus, mitigation gives more time for adaptation and it leaves more options open, such as nature-based solutions.

Regional impacts

Africa 

In Africa, risk from sea level rise is amplified by the future population growth. It is believed that 54.2 million people lived in the highly exposed low elevation coastal zones (LECZ) around 2000, but this number will effectively double to around 110 million people by 2030, and by 2060 it'll be in the range between 185 and 230 million people, depending on the extent of population growth. While the average regional sea level rise by 2060 will be around 21 cm (with climate change scenarios making little difference at that point), local geography and population trends interact to increase the exposure to hazards like 100-year floods in a complex manner.

In the near term, some of the largest displacement is projected to occur in the East Africa region, where at least 750,000 people are likely to be displaced from the coasts between 2020 and 2050. It was also estimated that by 2050, 12 major African cities (Abidjan, Alexandria, Algiers, Cape Town, Casablanca, Dakar, Dar es Salaam, Durban, Lagos, Lomé, Luanda and Maputo) would collectively sustain cumulative damages of USD 65 billion for the "moderate" climate change scenario RCP 4.5 and USD 86.5 billion for the high-emission scenario RCP 8.5: the version of the high-emission scenario with additional impacts from high ice sheet instability would involve up to 137.5 billion USD in damages. Additional accounting for the "low-probability, high-damage events" may increase aggregate risks to USD 187 billion for the "moderate" RCP4.5, USD 206 billion for RCP8.5 and USD 397 billion under the high-end instability scenario. In all of these estimates, the Egyptian city of Alexandria alone amounts for around half of this figure: hundreds of thousands of people in its low-lying areas may already have to be relocated in the coming decade. Across sub-Saharan Africa as a whole, damages from sea level rise could reach 2–4% of GDP by 2050, although this is strongly affected by the extent of future economic growth and adaptation.

In the longer term, Egypt, Mozambique and Tanzania are also projected to have the largest number of people affected by annual flooding amongst all African countries if global warming reaches 4 °C by the end of the century (a level associated with the RCP 8.5 scenario). Under RCP 8.5, 10 important cultural sites (Casbah of Algiers, Carthage Archaeological site, Kerkouane, Leptis Magna Archaeological site, Medina of Sousse, Medina of Tunis, Sabratha Archaeological site, Robben Island, Island of Saint-Louis and Tipasa) would be at risk of flooding and erosion by the end of the century, along with a total of 15 Ramsar sites and other natural heritage sites (Bao Bolong Wetland Reserve, Delta du Saloum National Park, Diawling National Park, Golfe de Boughrara, Kalissaye, Lagune de Ghar el Melh et Delta de la Mejerda, Marromeu Game Reserve, Parc Naturel des Mangroves du Fleuve Cacheu, Seal Ledges Provincial Nature Reserve, Sebkhet Halk Elmanzel et Oued Essed, Sebkhet Soliman, Réserve Naturelle d'Intérêt Communautaire de la Somone, Songor Biosphere Reserve, Tanbi Wetland Complex and Watamu Marine National Park).

Asia 

As of 2022, it is estimated that 63 million people in the East and South Asia are already at risk from a 100-year flood, in large part due to inadequate coastal protection in many countries. This will be greatly exacerbated in the future: Asia has the largest population at risk from sea level and Bangladesh, China, India, Indonesia, Japan, Philippines, Thailand and Vietnam alone account for 70% number of people exposed to sea level rise during the 21st century. This is entirely due to the region's densely populated coasts, as the rate of sea level rise in Asia is generally similar to the global average. Exceptions include the Indo-Pacific region, where it had been around 10% faster since the 1990s, and the coast of China, where globally "extreme" sea level rise had been detected since the 1980s, and it is believed that the difference between and of global warming would have a disproportionate impact on flood frequency. It is also estimated that future sea level rise along the Japanese Honshu Island would be up to 25 cm faster than the global average under RCP 8.5, the intense climate change scenario. RCP 8.5 is additionally associated with the loss of at least a third of the Japanese beaches and 57–72% of Thai beaches.

One estimate finds that Asia will suffer direct economic damages of 167.6 billion USD at 0.47 meters of sea level rise, 272.3 billion USD at 1.12 meters and 338.1 billion USD at 1.75 meters (along with the indirect impact of 8.5, 24 or 15 billion USD from population displacement at those levels), with China, India, the Republic of Korea, Japan, Indonesia and Russia experiencing the largest economic losses. Out of the 20 coastal cities expected to see the highest flood losses by 2050, 13 are in Asia. For nine of those (Bangkok, Guangzhou, Ho Chi Minh City, Jakarta, Kolkata, Nagoya, Tianjin , Xiamen and Zhanjiang) sea level rise would be compounded by subsidence. By 2050, Guangzhou would see 0.2 meters of sea level rise and the estimated annual economic losses of 254 million USD - the highest in the world. One estimate calculates that in the absence of adaptation, cumulative economic losses caused by sea level rise in Guangzhou under RCP8.5 would reach ~331 billion USD by 2050, ~660 billion USD by 2070 and 1.4 trillion USD by 2100, while the impact of high-end ice sheet instability would increase these figures to ~420 billion USD, ~840 billion USD and ~1.8 trillion USD, respectively. In Shanghai, coastal inundation amounts to ~0.03% of local GDP; but would increase to 0.8% (confidence interval of 0.4–1.4%) by 2100 even under the "moderate" RCP 4.5 scenario in the absence of adaptation. Likewise, failing to adapt to sea level rise in Mumbai would result in the damages of 112–162 billion USD by 2050, which would nearly triple by 2070. As the result, efforts like the Mumbai Coastal Road are being implemented, although they are likely to affect coastal ecosystems and fishing livelihoods. Nations with extensive rice production along the coasts like Bangladesh, Vietnam and China are already seeing adverse impacts from saltwater intrusion.

It is estimated that sea level rise in Bangladesh may force the relocation of up to one-third of power plants as early as 2030, while a similar proportion would have to deal with the increased salinity of their cooling water by then. Research from 2010s indicates that by 2050, between 0.9 and 2.1 million people would be displaced by sea level rise alone: this would likely necessitate the creation of ~594,000 additional jobs and ~197,000 housing units in the areas receiving the displaced persons, as well as to secure the supply of additional ~783 billion calories worth of food. in 2021, another paper estimated that 816,000 would be directly displaced by sea level rise by 2050, but this would be increased to 1,3 million when the indirect effects are taken into account. Both studies assume that the majority of the displaced people would travel to the other areas of Bangladesh, and attempt to estimate population changes in different localities.

In an attempt to address these challenges, the Bangladesh Delta Plan 2100 has been launched in 2018. As of 2020, it was seen falling short of most of its initial targets. The progress is being monitored.

In 2019, the president of Indonesia, Joko Widodo, declared that the city of Jakarta is sinking to a degree that requires him to move the capital to another city. A study conducted between 1982 and 2010 found that some areas of Jakarta have been sinking by as much as 28 cm (11 inches) per year due to ground water drilling and the weight of its buildings, and the problem is now exacerbated by sea level rise. However, there are concerns that building in a new location will increase tropical deforestation. Other so called sinking cities, such as Bangkok or Tokyo, are vulnerable to these compounding subsidence with sea level rise.

Australasia 

In Australia, erosion and flooding of Queensland's Sunshine Coast beaches is projected to intensify by 60% by 2030, with severe impacts on tourism in the absence of adaptation. Adaptation costs to sea level rise under the high-emission RCP 8.5 scenario are projected to be three times greater than the adaptation costs to low-emission RCP 2.6 scenario. For 0.2- to 0.3-m sea level rise (set to occur by 2050), what is currently a 100-year flood would occur every year in New Zealand cities of Wellington and Christchurch. Under 0.5 m sea level rise, the current 100-year flood in Australia would be likely to occur several times a year, while in New Zealand, buildings with a collective worth of NZ$12.75 billion would become exposed to new 100-year floods. A meter or so of sea level rise would threaten assets in New Zealand with a worth of NZD$25.5 billion (with a disproportionate impact on Maori-owned holdings and cultural heritage objects), and Australian assets with a worth of AUD$164–226 billion (including many unsealed roads and railway lines). The latter represents a 111% rise in Australia's inundation costs between 2020 and 2100.

Central and South America 

By 2100, a minimum of 3-4 million people in South America would be directly affected by coastal flooding and erosion. 6% of the population of Venezuela, 56% of the population of Guyana (including in the capital, Georgetown, much of which is already below the sea level) and 68% of the population of Suriname are already living in low-lying areas exposed to sea level rise. In Brazil, the coastal ecoregion of Caatinga is responsible for 99% of its shrimp production, yet its unique conditions are threatened by a combination of sea level rise, ocean warming and ocean acidification. The port complex of Santa Catarina had been interrupted by extreme wave or wind behavior 76 times in one 6-year period in 2010s, with a 25,000-50,000 USD loss for each idle day. In Port of Santos, storm surges were three times more frequent between 2000 and 2016 than between 1928 and 1999.

Europe 

Venice is one of the cities which had been the most threatened by flooding. The city is located on islands in the delta of the Po and Piave rivers. Sea level rise causes an increase in frequency and magnitude of floodings in the city which had already spent more than $6 billion on the flood barrier system.

Netherlands is a country that sits partially below sea level and is subsiding. It has responded to that reality by extending its Delta Works program. In 2008, the Dutch Delta Commission, advised in a report that the Netherlands would need a massive new building program to strengthen the country's water defenses against the rising sea for the following 190 years. This included drawing up worst-case plans for evacuations. The plan also included between €1.0 and €1.5 billion in annual spending through to the year 2100 for precautionary measures, such as broadening coastal dunes and strengthening sea and river dikes.
Analysis of the impacts of Hurricane Sandy determined that communities located behind wetlands
experienced 20% less damage (Narayan et al., 2016). Coral reefs are providing 544 million USD yr−1 (Beck et al., 2018a) and mangroves
22 billion USD yr−1 in property protection for coastal communities in the USA and Mexico

North America 

As of 2017, around 95 million Americans lived on the coast: for Canada and Mexico, this figure amounts to 6.5 million and 19 million people. Northern Gulf of Mexico, Atlantic Canada and the Pacific coast of Mexico would experience the greatest sea level rise. By 2030, flooding along the US Gulf Coast may result in economic losses of up to 176 billion USD: around 50 billion USD could be potentially avoided through nature-based solutions such as wetland restoration and oyster reef restoration. By 2050, the frequency of coastal flooding in the US is expected to rise to the current baseline of four "moderate" flooding events per year, even without storms and/or heavy rainfall.20 million people in the greater New York City area would be threatened, as 40% of the existing water treatment facilities would be compromised and 60% of power plants will need to be relocated. In California alone,  of SLR could affect 600,000 people and threaten over 150 billion USD in property with inundation, potentially representing more than 6% of the state's GDP. In North Carolina, a meter of SLR inundates 42% of the Albemarle-Pamlico Peninsula, incurring losses of up to 14 billion USD (at 2016 value of the currency). In nine southeast US states, the same level of sea level rise would amount to the loss over 1000 sites eligible for inclusion in the National Register for Historic Places and up to 13,000 historical and archaeological sites overall.

Sea level rise causes the mixing of sea water into the coastal groundwater, rendering it unusable once it amounts to more than 2-3% of the reservoir. Along an estimated 15% of the US coastline, the majority of local groundwater levels are already below the sea level. It also favors chronic flooding at high tide, as evidenced e.g. in the US East Coast. Similarly, Florida, which is extremely vulnerable to climate change, is already experiencing substantial nuisance flooding and king tide flooding. Nonpartisan think tank Resources for the Future describes Miami as "the most vulnerable major coastal city in the world" to damages associated with storm-related coastal flooding and sea level rise. Storm surges can cause the largest loss of life and property in the world's coastal areas, and their frequency and intensity has increased in the recent years. New York City is one of the worst affected areas, and simulations show that the current 100-year flood would occur once in 19–68 years by 2050 and 40–60 years by 2080. U.S. coastal cities conduct beach nourishment, also known as beach replenishment, where mined sand is trucked in and added, in addition to other adaptation measures such as zoning, restrictions on state funding, and building code standards. In Mexico, the damages from SLR to tourism hotspots like Cancun, Isla Mujeres, Playa del Carmen, Puerto Morelos and Cozumel could amount to 1.4–2.3 billion USD. The damages are also widespread in Canada and will affect both major cities like Halifax and the more remote locations like Lennox Island, whose Mi'kmaq community is already considering relocation due to widespread coastal erosion.

Island nations 

Small island states are nations whose populations are concentrated on atolls and other low islands. This means that no other place is more vulnerable to coastal erosion, flooding and salt intrusion into soils and freshwater caused by sea level rise. The latter may render an island uninhabitable well before it is completely flooded. Already, children in small island states are encountering hampered access to food and water and are suffering an increased rate of mental and social disorders due to these stressors. At current rates, sea level would be high enough to make the Maldives uninhabitable by 2100, while five of the Solomon Islands have already disappeared due to the combined effects of sea level rise and stronger trade winds that were pushing water into the Western Pacific. 

Adaptation to sea level rise is costly for small island nations as a large portion of their population lives in areas that are at risk. Nations like Maldives, Kiribati and Tuvalu are already forced to consider controlled international migration of their population in response to rising seas, since the alternative of uncontrolled migration threatens to exacerbate the humanitarian crisis of climate refugees. In 2014, Kiribati had purchased 20 square kilometers of land (about 2.5% of Kiribati's current area) on the Fijian island of Vanua Levu to relocate its population there once their own islands are lost to the sea.  

While Fiji is also impacted by sea level rise, it is in a comparatively safer position, and its residents continue to rely on local adaptation like moving further inland and increasing sediment supply to combat erosion instead of relocating entirely. Fiji has also issued a green bond of $50 million to invest in green initiatives and use the proceeds to fund adaptation efforts, and it is restoring coral reefs and mangroves to protect itself flooding and erosion as a more cost-efficient alternative to building sea walls, with the nations of Palau and Tonga adopting similar efforts. At the same time, even when an island is not threatened with complete disappearance due to flooding, tourism and local economies may end up devastated. For instance, a sea level rise of  would cause partial or complete inundation of 29% of coastal resorts in the Caribbean, while a further 49–60% of coastal resorts would be at risk from resulting coastal erosion. 

If all islands of an island nation become uninhabitable or completely submerged by the sea, the states themselves would theoretically also become dissolved, removing their rights on the surrounding sea area (a radius of  around the entire island state). Mineral exploration and extraction efforts by international actors would no longer involve paying commission to the former state.

Past sea level rise 

Understanding past sea level is an important guide to current and future changes. In the recent geological past, thermal expansion from increased temperatures and changes in land ice are the dominant reasons of sea level rise. The last time that the Earth was  warmer than pre-industrial temperatures was 120 thousand years ago, when warming because of changes in the amount of sunlight due to slow changes in the Earth's orbit caused the Eemian interglacial; sea levels during that warmer interglacial were at least  higher than now. The Eemian warming was sustained over a period of thousands of years, and the magnitude of the rise in sea level implies a large contribution from the Antarctic and Greenland ice sheets. Further into the past, a report by the Royal Netherlands Institute for Sea Research states that, around three million years ago, levels of carbon dioxide in the Earth's atmosphere similar to today's levels increased temperature by two to three degrees Celsius and melted one third of Antarctica's ice sheets. This in turn caused sea-levels to rise 20 metres over their present values.

Rapid disintegration of these ice sheets led to so called 'meltwater pulses', periods during which sea level rose rapidly. The rate of rise started to slow down about 8,200 years before present; the sea level was then almost constant in the last 2,500 years, before the recent rising trend that started at the end of the 19th century or in the beginning of the 20th.

See also 

 Climate emergency declaration
 Climate engineering
 Coastal development hazards
 Effects of climate change on oceans
 Effects of climate change on small island countries
 Hydrosphere
 Islands First
 List of countries by average elevation

References

External links 

NASA Satellite Data 1993-present
Fourth National Climate Assessment Sea Level Rise Key Message
Incorporating Sea Level Change Scenarios at the Local Level Outlines eight steps a community can take to develop site-appropriate scenarios
The Global Sea Level Observing System (GLOSS)
USA Sea Level Rise Viewer (NOAA)

Oceanography
Rise
Effects of climate change
Coastal geography
Climate change adaptation
Articles containing video clips